Ophiogomphus severus is a species of dragonfly in the family Gomphidae. It is commonly known as the pale snaketail.

Subspecies 
There are two described subspecies of Ophiogomphus severus. The following are the two subspecies:
Ophiogomphus severus montanus
Ophiogomphus severus severus

References 
Ordonates Frame
Catalogue of Life : 2009 Annual Checklist
Ophiogomphus severus (Pale Snaketail)
Dragonflies, Anisoptera, of California
CALIFORNIA CLUBTAILS

Ophiogomphus
Odonata of North America
Insects described in 1874